The North East Area, Ipswich is one of five administrative areas in Ipswich, through which Ipswich Borough Council divides its spending and enables feedback from local residents, businesses and community groups.

The area is composed of three wards, each represented by three councillors. Each ward is also a Middle Layer Super Output Area (MSOA). As of the 2019 Ipswich Borough Council election, the councillors are as follows:

These Councillors form the North East Area Committee of which Shelly (Michelle) Darwin is the chair.  Three Suffolk County Council Councillors are co-opted members of the committee. The divisions they represent are either fully or partially in the South East Area:

The area is also covered by a Neighbourhood Watch network which comprises 35 neighbourhood watch schemes.

References

Areas in Ipswich
North East Area, Ipswich